Cayol is a French surname. People with the surname include: 

 Bartolomé Cayol (c. 1800-1877), French engineer and businessman
 Lucien Cayol (1893-1960), French World War I flying ace
 Pierre Cayol (born 14 August 1939), French contemporary painter
 Raymond Cayol (1917-1997), French politician